Richard Aldrich may refer to:
 Richard Aldrich (music critic) (1863–1937), American music critic
 Richard Aldrich (artist) (born 1975), American painter
 Richard Aldrich (producer) (1902–1986), American producer
 Richard S. Aldrich (1884–1941),  U.S. Representative from Rhode Island
 Richard W. Aldrich, American neuroscientist
 Richard J. Aldrich (1961-), British political scientist and historian